The Ride of a Lifetime is a 2019 memoir written by media executive and businessman Bob Iger describing his elevation to fame and corporate achievements in his life.

References

American memoirs
2019 non-fiction books
Random House books
Disney books